Sagzi (also Romanized as Sejzī and Sejzī; also known as Sejzī, Sejzi, and Sejzī) is a city in the Central District of Isfahan County, Isfahan Province, Iran. It is located northeast by road from Isfahan and contains an industrial area to the southwest of the city. At the 2006 census, its population was 4,392, in 1,216 families.

References

Populated places in Isfahan County
Cities in Isfahan Province